The Gabala FC 2011-12 season is Gabala FC's sixth Azerbaijan Premier League season, and their second season under manager Tony Adams.
On 16 November 2011, Adams resigned due to family problems. Adams' replacement was announced as Fatih Kavlak.

On 23 December Gabala revealed that Serge Djiehoua had terminated his contract with the club and that they are now seeking a new forward.
On 7 January 2012, Gabala announced the signing of Yannick Kamanan from Mersin İdmanyurdu on a two-half year deal to replace the recently departed Serge Djiehoua.
On 9 January 2012, Gabala and Shakhtar Donetsk announced a partnership that would see the possibility of players being sent on loan to Gabala from Shakhtar.

Squad

Transfers

In

Out

Loans out

Released

Friendlies

Competitions

Premier League

Results summary

Results by round

Results

Notes
The match is played without spectators.

Table

Premier League Championship Group

Results summary

Results by round

Results

Table

Azerbaijan Cup

Gabala lost on away goals

Squad statistics

Appearances and goals

|-
|colspan="14"|Players who appeared for Gabala no longer at the club:

|}

Goal scorers

Disciplinary record

Awards

Player of the Month

Team kit
These are the 2011–12 Gabala F.C. kits.

|
|

References

External links 
Gabala FC Website
Gabala FC at UEFA.com
Gabala FC at Soccerway.com
Gabala FC at National Football Teams.com

Gabala FC seasons
Gabala